Erkki Bahovski (born 22 April 1970) is an Estonian journalist and press officer.

Education
Bahovski studied at the Estonian Institute of Human Sciences from 1989 to 1992. From 1992 to 1999, he studied history at Tartu University. Bahovski studied at the Groningen University in Netherlands in 1994, in the Reuters Foundation of the Oxford University in 2004, and in the International Visitors Leadership Programme in the U.S. in 2006.

Career
Bahovski worked for Postimees, the largest newspaper in Estonia, from 1995 until 2008. After that, he became the European Commission Representation's press officer for Estonia until 2011.
He was a permanent guest on the weekly radio show Rahva Teenrid (People's Servants) in 2006–2008. Since 2011, he is the host of the foreign policy broadcast on the Estonian National Broadcasting. Bahovski is a member of the Estonian Foreign Policy Institute (:et).

References

1970 births
Living people
Estonian journalists
Recipients of the Order of the White Star, 5th Class
Diplomaatia editors